The West Middlesex Waterworks Company was a utility company supplying water to parts of west London in England. The company was established in 1806 with works at Hammersmith and became part of the publicly owned Metropolitan Water Board in 1904.

Origins

The West Middlesex Waterworks Company was founded by serial entrepreneur Ralph Dodd in 1806 to supply water to the Marylebone and Paddington areas of London. In 1808 the company installed cast iron pipes to supply water from its intakes at Hammersmith.

Infrastructure
The water company established a 3.5 million gallon reservoir at Campden Hill near Notting Hill just west of Central London. Soon after, in 1825 the company built a new reservoir at Barrow Hill next to Primrose Hill just north of Central London. In the 1850s the quality of drinking water in London was connected to poor public health. John Snow examined the state of waters in 1849 and noted that the West Middlesex was less subject to cholera because its intakes were upstream and it had large reservoirs. The Metropolis Water Act 1852 (succeeded by two others of the same name in 1871 and 1902) was enacted under the conclusions of a report of the Metropolitan Water Board "to make provision for securing the supply to the Metropolis of pure and wholesome water". Under the Act it became unlawful for any water company to extract water for domestic use from the tidal reaches of the Thames after 31 August 1855, and from 31 December 1855 all such water was required to be "effectually filtered". The Company closed the Hammersmith site and new pumping works were established between Sunbury and Molesey Locks at Hampton. The Hampton facility was completed in 1855 and was shared with the Southwark and Vauxhall Waterworks Company and the Grand Junction Waterworks Company.

See also
London water supply infrastructure

References

London water infrastructure
British companies established in 1806
Former water company predecessors of Thames Water
1806 establishments in England